Oksoko (Oak-soak-oh; from Öksökö, a mythical bird of Yakut folklore) is a genus of oviraptorid dinosaur from the Late Cretaceous of Asia, that lived in what is now the Nemegt Formation in Mongolia. It includes the type species Oksoko avarsan.

History of discovery

The first specimen of Oksoko, MPC-D 100/33, was discovered in 1974 by the Soviet-Mongolian Palaeontological Expedition at the Bügiin Tsav locality in the Nemegt Formation of Mongolia. It is represented by a partial subadult postcranial skeleton. The holotype specimen is a block of an assemblage of three individuals buried in life positions that has been labelled as MPC-D 102/110. The first individual, subcatalogued as MPC-D 102/110a, is a partial skeleton of a juvenile preserving the skull, cervical vertebrae, pelvis, hindlimbs, and caudal vertebrae. Another specimen in this block is represented by MPC-D 102/110b, a large quadrate and quadratojugal. The third specimen in this assemblage is MPC-D 102/110c, a juvenile postcranial skeleton. This block was in 2006 confiscated from poachers by the General Intelligence Agency of Mongolia along with a fourth specimen, MPC-D 102/11, representing a partial juvenile skeleton preserving the skull. They were later returned to the Mongolian Palaeontological Center on December 14 during the same year, where they were posteriorly prepared by professionals. Both specimens share taphonomical traits, such as the death pose, sediments and preservation state, which may suggest that MPC-D 102/11 is part of the holotype block assemblage.

Though the exact localities of these specimens are currently unknown due to their theft, the color of their sediments and geochemical analyses confirm their provenance from the Nemegt Formation. Another, and isolated specimen was collected in 1998 at the Guriliin Tsav locality by a joint expedition from the Hayashibara Museum of Natural Sciences and the Mongolian Palaeontological Center. It was catalogued as MPC-D 102/12 and represents postcranial skeleton of an adult individual. All of the specimens were later assigned to the new genus and type species Oksoko avarsan, named in 2020 by the paleontologists Gregory F. Funston, Tsogtbaatar Chinzorig, Khishigjav Tsogtbaatar, Yoshitsugu Kobayashi, Corwin Sullivan and Philip J. Currie. The generic name, Oksoko, is derived from Öksökö, one of the multiple triple-headed eagles in the Altaic mythologies, in reference to the holotypic block assemblage preserving three skulls. The specific name, O. avarsan, is taken from the Mongolian word аварсан (avarsan, meaning rescued) given that specimens of the genus were redeemed from fossil poachers.

Although MPC-D 100/33 has been largely referred as a paratype of Heyuannia, this specimen shares several traits with other specimens of Oksoko including a reduced third metacarpal. To date, Oksoko is unequivocally known from at least two localities of the Nemegt Formation: Bügiin Tsav and Guriliin Tsav.

Description

The holotype is a nearly complete juvenile skeleton intertwined with three other individuals. Notably, three skulls and a good amount of arm material are known. The known manus has only two functional fingers, with the third being significantly reduced. Such a morphology is also seen in a wide variety of theropods such as a few carcharodontosaurian allosauroids, however it can also be seen in other coelurosaurs such as the tyrannosaurids, the avialan Balaur bondoc, and caudipterid oviraptorosaurs.

Classification

The describers' phylogenetic analysis places it as a derived member of the subfamily Heyuanninae in the family Oviraptoridae. It has been suggested that Oksoko represents a highly derived form in a series of oviraptorosaurs whose third digits have reduced over evolutionary time. Their cladogram is shown below (only relationships within Oviraptoridae are shown):

Paleoenvironment
Oksoko was found in the Nemegt Formation, one of the most productive fossil sites in Mongolia. Oksoko lived alongside other theropods, such as other oviraptorosaurs, tyrannosaurids, dromaeosaurids, troodontids, alvarezsaurids, therizinosaurids, ornithomimosaurs, and early birds. Hadrosauroids, pachycephalosaurs, ankylosaurs, and titanosaurs are also known from the formation. Fossils of a pterosaur, crocodilians, and small mammals are also present.

References

Oviraptorosaurs
Late Cretaceous dinosaurs of Asia
Cretaceous Mongolia
Fossil taxa described in 2020
Nemegt fauna